The N81 road is a national secondary road in Ireland, from the M50 motorway to Tullow, County Carlow, north to south. The N81 continues past Tullow for another 8 km to terminate at the village of Closh, County Carlow, where it intersects the N80. The road is a dual carriageway between M50 motorway and west of Tallaght, known as the Tallaght Bypass or Blessington Road. It intersects with the M50 motorway at Junction 11.

The N81 is the only major national road emanating from Dublin that is a national secondary rather than national primary road.

The official definition of the N81 from the Roads Act, 1993 (Declaration of National Roads) Order, 2012  states:

N81: Dublin — Closh Cross, County Carlow

Between its junction with M50 at Templeogue in the county of South Dublin and its junction with N80 at Closh Cross in the county of Carlow via Tallaght Bypass, Blessington Road, Jobstown, Gibbons, Corbally, Crooksling and Brittas in the county of South Dublin: Moanaspick, Tinode; Main Street at Blessington; and Burgage More in the county of Wicklow: Glebe East in the county of Kildare: Burgage Moyle and Russborough in the county of Wicklow; Bishopslane and Horsepasstown in the county of Kildare: Poulaphoca Bridge at the boundary between the county of Kildare and the county of Wicklow: Hollywood Lower, Hollywood Cross, Whitestown, Castleruddery; Mill Street and Edward Street at Baltinglass; and Holdenstown Lower in the county of Wicklow: Bough, Rathvilly, Kilmagarvoge; Dublin Road, Church Street, Market Square, Bridge Street and Abbey Street in the town of Tullow; and Castlegrace in the county of Carlow.

History 

The route was previously known as the T42 (trunk road).

The Dublin and Blessington Steam Tramway once took this route from Terenure to Blessington before it was closed in 1932 due to falling passenger numbers.

In the 1990s when it was proposed to reestablish a tram system in Dublin due to chronic traffic congestion (see Luas), the old tram route from the city centre via Terenure to Tallaght was proposed.

This route was later ruled out as a result of space constraints and the pipes under the N81 route seemingly being too old in the Terenure area, thus proving to be a great deal more expensive for utility diversion. The Luas instead was made to follow a less direct route from the City to Tallaght, following the Southern Canal ring and then moving south to Tallaght alongside the M50 Motorway.

Planned upgrade 
In a Dáil Éireann debate dated 2 July 2019 it was mentioned that the N81 is one of the most dangerous roads in the State with twice the national average for single vehicle collisions and seven times the national average of head-on collisions.

In 2021 Minister for Transport Eamon Ryan mentioned that the N81 Tallaght to Hollywood Cross road improvement scheme was not included in the projects to be developed during the current NDP period of 2018–2027, in effect pausing any work on the project until after this date.

See also
Roads in Ireland 
Motorways in Ireland
National primary road
Regional road
List of streets and squares in Dublin

References

External links
Map of N81 route

National secondary roads in the Republic of Ireland
Roads in County Dublin
Roads in County Wicklow
Roads in County Carlow
Templeogue